Fa'nipol railway station is a railway station in Fanipol, Belarus.

History
The station was built in 1870 as a stopping point. Then, in 1871, the stopping point become To'karevskaya station, named in honor of A. Tokarev, governor of Minsk Province and founder of the Brest-Moscow railroad. On August 9, 1876, the railway station began to be called "Fanipol". As of 2008, about 150 freight and passenger trains pass through the Fanipol railway station every day.

References

External links
Belarusian Railways (Беларуская Чыгунка)

Railway stations in Belarus
Railway stations opened in 1870